2018 Cerezo Osaka season.

Squad
As of 4 June 2018.

Out on loan

Last updated 10 January 2018.

Senior Team

J1 League

U-23 Team

J3 League

References

External links
 J.League official site

Cerezo Osaka
Cerezo Osaka seasons